Vent'anni may refer to:
 Twenty Years (film) (Italian: Vent'anni), a 1949 Italian comedy film
 Vent'anni (Massimo Ranieri song)
 Vent'anni (Måneskin song)